Horacio de la Peña and Jorge Lozano were the defending champions, but lost in the semifinals this year.

Mike Bauer and Piet Norval won in the final 7–5, 7–6, against Ģirts Dzelde and Goran Prpić.

Seeds

  Mark Koevermans /  Menno Oosting (quarterfinals)
  Mike Bauer /  Piet Norval (champions)
  Christer Allgårdh /  Tobias Svantesson (quarterfinals)
  Horacio de la Peña /  Jorge Lozano (semifinals)

Draw

Draw

References

External links
 Draw

1993 ATP Tour
1993 Grand Prix Hassan II